Robert af Jochnick (born 1940) is a Swedish businessman, most notable for co-founding Oriflame Cosmetics with his brother Jonas af Jochnick in 1967 in Sweden. In 2003 the brothers shared the International Swede of the Year award. As of 2006, Robert af Jochnick was Sweden's 34th wealthiest person as estimated by business magazine Veckans Affärer.

See also
List of multi-level marketing companies

References

External links
Official website

1940 births
Living people
People associated with direct selling